Ram Chandra Majhi is an Indian politician. He was elected to the Lok Sabha, the lower house of the Parliament of India as a member of the Jharkhand Party.

References

External links
Official biographical sketch in Parliament of India website

Lok Sabha members from Odisha
India MPs 1952–1957
India MPs 1957–1962
Possibly living people
Jharkhand Party politicians